The Great Choral Synagogue on Gogoļa iela (Gogol Street) was the largest synagogue in Riga, until it was burned down on 4 July 1941.

The synagogue was designed in 1868 by architect Paul von Hardenack and the building was completed in 1871. The architecture consisted of several different styles, however, Neo-Renaissance was the dominant style. The synagogue was famous throughout the city for its cantors and its choir.

The synagogue was burned down on 4 July 1941 after the Nazi German occupation  of Riga. There are reports that 20 Jews were locked in the basement.  Historian Bernhard Press states that some of the victims were Lithuanian Jews who had taken refuge there.  Gertrude Schneider identifies the victims as mostly women and children. Frida Michelson, a Latvian Jew who had been working near Jelgava in a forced labor detail when the synagogue was burned, reported that she was told by a friend (who had heard it from someone else) that the halls and the backyard of the Choral Synagogue were filled with refugees from Lithuania.  Perkonkrusts and "other Latvian hangers-on" surrounded the building, trapped the people inside, and set it on fire.  Andrew Ezergailis does not find it credible that Jews were locked in the Great Choral Synagogue before it was set on fire.  Ezergailis does acknowledge that there could have been 300 Lithuanian refugees in the synagogue before the fire was set.  He postulates however that they would have been killed before the synagogue was set on fire.

The destruction of the synagogue was filmed by the Germans and later became part of a Wehrmacht newsreel, with the following narration: "The synagogue in Riga, which had been spared by the GPU commissars in their work of destruction, went up in flames a few hours later."

After the war, the remains of the burnt-out synagogue were demolished by Soviet authorities and the area was turned into a public square, with the first commemorative stone marking a Star of David being placed at the location only in 1988. After the restoration of Latvia's independence, a memorial designed by Latvian architect Sergejs Rižs in the shape of the synagogue walls with built-in archaeological remains of the original building found at the site, was erected on the grounds in 1993. In 2007 a memorial to Jānis Lipke and others who had saved Jews from the Holocaust was unveiled next to the 1993 memorial. The memorial commemorates all those, who helped save more than 400 Jews from certain death.

See also
Burning of the Riga synagogues
Peitav Synagogue

References

External links 
 Great Choral Synagogue on LiveRīga.com (Riga tourism portal)

Former synagogues in Latvia
Synagogues completed in 1871
Synagogues in Riga
Synagogues destroyed by Nazi Germany